Warren Bryant (November 11, 1955 – October 10, 2021) was an American professional football player who was an offensive tackle from 1977 through 1984 in the National Football League (NFL). He played college football at the University of Kentucky. He was selected by the Atlanta Falcons in the first round of the 1977 NFL draft with the sixth overall pick.He was a Fan favorite. Made many Personal Appearances in and around the Atlanta Area.

Bryant died on October 10, 2021, in Smyrna, Georgia. He was 65.

References

External links
NFL.com player page

1955 births
2021 deaths
American football offensive tackles
Kentucky Wildcats football players
Atlanta Falcons players
Los Angeles Raiders players
All-American college football players
Players of American football from Miami